Zyklon-B was a Norwegian black metal band founded in 1995.

History
The band's members were Tomas "Samoth" Thormodsæter Haugen (guitar and bass) and Vegard "Ihsahn" Sverre Tveitan (keyboard) from Emperor, Kjetil "Frost" Haraldstad (drums) from Satyricon and Björn "Aldrahn" Dencker Gjerde (vocals) from Dødheimsgard. Their lyrics deal mainly with death, apocalypse and warfare. The band recorded only one EP; other versions of the featured songs were featured on split releases with Mayhem and Swordmaster.

The band Zyklon featuring members of Zyklon-B is often incorrectly thought to be the same band. The name refers to Zyklon B, a gas used in gas chambers during the Holocaust. Despite the name the band states that "Zyklon-B is not related to any political or racial preference".

Discography 

Blood Must Be Shed EP (1995)
"Mental Orgasm" – 2:54
"Bloodsoil" – 2:25
"Warfare" – 5:35
Blood Must Be Shed / Wraths of Time split EP with Swordmaster (1996)
"Mental Orgasm" – 2:54
"Bloodsoil" – 2:25
"Warfare" – 5:35
"Wraths of Time" – 5:37
"Upon Blood and Ashes" – 5:17
"Conspiracy - Preview" – 2:56
Necrolust / Total Warfare split single with Mayhem (1999)
"Necrolust (Unreleased Studio Version)" – 3:43
"Total Warfare (Sea Serpent Remix)" – 5:46

References

Norwegian black metal musical groups
Musical groups established in 1995
1995 establishments in Norway
Musical groups disestablished in 1999
1999 disestablishments in Norway
Musical groups from Norway with local place of origin missing